Entomosterna is a genus of beetles in the family Cerambycidae, containing the following species:

 Entomosterna cruentata Chevrolat, 1862
 Entomosterna ruficollis Chemsak & Hovore, in Eya, 2010

References

Trachyderini
Cerambycidae genera